Tasta is a borough of the city of Stavanger in Rogaland county, Norway.

It may also refer to:

Tasta Church, a parish church in Stavanger municipality in Rogaland county, Norway
Tasta IL or Tasta Idrettslag, a Norwegian association football club from Tasta, Stavanger, Rogaland

See also
Indre Tasta, a neighborhood (delområde) in the city of Stavanger in Rogaland county, Norway
Ytre Tasta, a neighborhood (delområde) in the city of Stavanger in Rogaland county, Norway